The Strauchon River is a short river of the West Coast Region of New Zealand's South Island. It flows southwest from the face of the Strauchon Glacier to reach the Copland River five kilometres northwest of Mount Sefton. The river's entire length is within Westland Tai Poutini National Park.

See also
List of rivers of New Zealand

References

Rivers of the West Coast, New Zealand
Westland District
Westland Tai Poutini National Park
Rivers of New Zealand